Child of the Universe is the fourth studio album by Australian singer–songwriter Delta Goodrem. It was released on 26 October 2012 by Sony Music Entertainment. The album was preceded by its three singles "Sitting on Top of the World", "Dancing with a Broken Heart" and "Wish You Were Here". The album debuted at number two on the ARIA Albums Chart and was certified Gold by the Australian Recording Industry Association for shipments of 35,000 copies.

Background

The album was originally in pre-production and writing stages in 2008 while Goodrem was in the United States, and was expected to be released in 2010 at some point. Commenting on the album in 2010, Goodrem said "What resonates with me now is the acoustic guitar and piano. I'm enjoying writing songs that are more stripped back. "I've done a 360 back to where I started, but hopefully it's more evolved. I feel I've stepped up my game. I'm experimenting with different chord changes and different areas of music. I feel I can do anything on this album, I'm relishing that. I feel like the sky's the limit but at the same time it's very raw." However, after some personal issues and moving countries the album was delayed. Goodrem said the album would be out "soon" and eventually said it would be out in late 2011. The album was again pushed back and said to be out early 2012. Although this didn't happen due to her role as a coach on The Voice Australia. The album was made available to stream in full through iTunes for free on 19 October 2012 and officially released a week later on 26 October 2012 in Australia and New Zealand on 9 November. The release of the album was almost exactly five years since her previous studio release, Delta, which was released on 20 October 2007. A theme present in this album is will to survive, rediscovering yourself and fighting for love and happiness in yourself.

Release and promotion

"Child of the Universe" was released digitally and physically on 26 October 2012 in Australia. That night Goodrem appeared on Australian TV program A Current Affair to promote the album. She performed "Wish You Were Here" and "Predictable". On 29 October 2012 Goodrem appeared on Australian morning TV program Sunrise. She performed songs including "Sitting on Top of the World" and "Wish You Were Here". She also performed a mash up of songs "Out of the Blue" and "Be Strong" from her second album Mistaken Identity. Goodrem did an interview on 5 November 2012 on nightly chat program The Project. The next day Goodrem appeared at the Melbourne Cup. After finishing her tour Goodrem flew to New Zealand to do promotion after the album was released there on 9 November 2012. After doing various breakfast morning TV interviews, radio interviews and a small show for her fans, Goodrem performed "Wish You Were Here" on New Zealand's Got Talent. After returning to Australia she appeared on Australian morning television show Mornings, singing "Wish You Were here" to promote the album. She then performed "Sitting on Top of the World" on the season final of Australia's Funniest Home Videos.

Singles
"Sitting on Top of the World" was released to radio on 5 April 2012 and released digitally and physically on 13 April 2012. The song reached number two on the ARIA Singles Chart and was certified double Platinum by the Australian Recording Industry Association for selling 140,000 copies. This became her first multi-platinum certified single since "Predictable" in 2003. It also charted on the New Zealand Singles Chart at number 23.  

"Dancing with a Broken Heart" was released to radio on 26 July 2012, released digitally on 10 August 2012 as the second single from Child of the Universe and debuted and peaked at number 15 on the ARIA Singles Chart. 

"Wish You Were Here" was released to radio on 4 October 2012 and released on 12 October 2012 as the third single. It debuted on the ARIA Singles Chart at number seven and later peaked at number five. It was certified Platinum for selling 70,000 copies.

An Evening with Delta: The Top of My World Shows

To promote the album, Goodrem embarked on an album launch half-tour "An Evening with Delta: The Top of My World Shows." The tour started off in Brisbane on 27 October 2012 the day after the album was released and was followed by two shows in Sydney on 31 October 2012 and 2 November 2012.  The tour finished with two Melbourne shows on 7 and 8 November 2012.

Critical reception
Tania Zeine from ARIA mentioned how the time off between albums allowed Goodrem to compose one of her greatest albums yet. They also praised Goodrem's "diversity of style and genre with her tracks" and that she "shows off vocally with her broad range of soulful harmonies and Christina Aguilera like power solos." Emily Booth from The AU Review rated the album 7.8/10. She noted highlights of the album include Child of the Universe, Touch, Hunters and the Wolves in which she noted that it was "excellently produced and wildly atmospheric and arguably the best track on the album", and Control. However she did point out that "Dancing with a Broken Heart" is still one of the weakest songs of her career. Booth said that, "The best thing about the new record is the diversity of styles, because she can really show off her best asset, from the rock-tinged vocals on 'When My Stars Come Out' to the Mariah Carey-style harmonies on 'Safe to Believe'. There are plenty of songs which pay their respects to her musical roots, for the fans of her older stuff, but Delta has always had a versatile voice."

Accolades
The album's first single "Sitting on Top of the World" was nominated for Song of the Year at the ARIA Music Awards of 2012, but lost to "Brother" by Matt Corby. Sitting on Top of the World also gained two nominations at the 2013 APRA Awards. The first was for "Pop Work of the Year" and the second being for "Most Played Australian Work". However the winner of both awards was Timomatic for Set it Off.

Commercial performance
The album debuted at number two on the Australian ARIA Albums Chart on 4 November 2012 with 16,000 copies sold. Goodrem was denied a fourth straight number one album by Taylor Swift who sold around 21,000 copies of her album Red. The next week Child of the Universe dropped one spot to number three but suffered big drops the next two weeks, dropping to number thirteen then number twenty four. It rose to number fifteen in its fifth week in Australia. In New Zealand the album debuted at number eighteen and then dropped to number twenty six the next week. Overall it spent three weeks on the New Zealand Albums Chart. Child of the Universe spent ten weeks in the Australian top fifty.

Track listing

B-sides
The following tracks were not released on the album, but were released on the singles.

Personnel

Delta Goodrem – vocals, piano, keyboards, Writer, Concept
Steve Booker – Producer
Chris Braide – Producer
Gary Clark – Producer, Writer
Robert Conley – Writer
Livvi Franc – Writer
Nick Jonas – Writer
Vince Pizzinga – Writer, Producer
Eric Rosse – Writer
John Shanks – Producer, Writer
Martin Terefe – Writer, Producer
Braddon Williams – Engineer
Murray Sheridan – Engineer 
Simon Todkill – Engineer
Chandler Harrod – Engineer 
Steve Genewick – Engineer 
Mike Horner – Engineer 
Tom Weir – Drum Engineering 
Baeho "Bobby" Shin – String Engineer 
Sam Keyte – Engineer, Programming 
Paul Lamalfa – Engineer, Programming
Luke Campolieta – Assistant Engineer 
Jonathan Baker – Assistant Engineer, Engineer 
Lars Fod – Pro-Tools 
Manny Marroquin – Mixing  
Miles Walker – Mixing 
Doug Brady – Mixing 
Thomas Juth – Mixing
Mark Endert – Mixing 
Leon Zervos – Mastering
Dan Chase – Drums, Keyboards
Michael Dolce – Guitar 
Victor Indrizzo – Percussion  
Charlie Judge – Keyboards 
Matt Laug – Drums 
The Love Sponge Strings – Strings 
Derrick McKenzie – Drums 
Mick Skelton – Drums, Percussion 
Smit – Engineer, Programming 
Adam Sofo – Keyboards, Piano 
Nikolaj Torp – Organ, Piano 
Warren Trout – Percussion

Charts

Weekly charts

Year-end charts

Certifications

Release history

References

2012 albums
Delta Goodrem albums
Sony Music Australia albums
Sony Music albums